John Forbes (born 29, January 1970) is an Australian sailor and has competed at three Olympic Games, winning a bronze at Barcelona 1992 and silver in 2000 at the Sydney Games. 

Forbes has won seven World Championships, four European Championships, and ten Australian Championships. He was voted Australian Sailor of the Year four times (91/92, 01/02, 02/03 & 03/04) and is also an Australian Institute of Sport scholarship holder.

Biography
John Forbes was introduced to catamaran sailing on an international level at the age of 12. He and his father Bob went to the USA to compete in the Nacra 5.2 North American Championships in 1982, where they were placed fourth. The following year, John and Bob attended the inaugural Nacra 5.2 World Championship, where they came second. John then traveled to Monterey Bay with fellow Australian David Renouf where they finished 4th place in the Nacra 5.8 North American Championship.

After this "deep-end dunking" as a crew, John took over the helm of various types of catamarans and in 1985 he won Australian Combined High Schools Championship outright together with his brother Rod on a Nacra 5.2 whilst winning a couple of the races in the series on handicap/yardstick as well outright. 

With Rod as his crew, John also came 3rd in the 1985 Nacra NSW State Championship, 1st in the 1986 Nacra NSW State Championship, 2nd in the Prindle 18 National Championship, and 4th in the Nacra Australian Championship.

John's first introduction to the International Tornado Class was at the Australian Championship 1986/87 in Perth, where, whilst only 16, he helmed his first Tornado catamaran and placed 10th amongst a star-studded fleet including Multi Olympic Gold Medalist Poul Elvstrom, "the Great Dane."

His youthful success and versatility, together with his accumulated competitive experience on different sized catamarans, resulted in him being approached by 1984 Olympic Bronze Medalist Chris Cairns, who asked John to sail with him. Together, they won the Kiel Week Regatta in 1987 followed by a second place in the Tornado Class World Championship of 1987.

In 1989, John teamed up with renowned Hobie sailor Rod Waterhouse to win the Australian Tornado Championship with a perfect score, winning all 8 heats. Rod Waterhouse's inability to travel overseas in 1989 led John to join up with longtime sailing rival Mitch Booth, and together they won the 1989 World Championship (Houston, Texas) by an astounding 36 points ahead of Giorgio Zuccoli from Italy. They also won the Australian Tornado Championships in 1990 and 1991.

A role reversal in 1991 saw John again taking over the helm to win the inaugural Nacra 5.8 World Championship (Harvey Bay, Queensland). Mitch and John's credits also include winning the Tornado Australian Championships in 1992, 1993 & 1994  and in 1992 they won their second Tornado World Championship (Perth, Australia).

Gold and Silver medals were also won in the Barcelona Pre-Olympic Games in 1990 and 1991 respectively, and the pair were rewarded when they won a bronze medal at the 1992 Barcelona Olympic Games. 
As a result, they were jointly awarded the prestigious 'New South Wales Yachtsman of the Year' trophy in November 1991 and again in 1992. As a final toast, they were again jointly honored with the distinguished award of Ampol Australian Yachtsman of the Year in 1992.

He scored second place at the 1993 Tornado World Championship (Long Beach, USA) and a third place at the 1994 World Championship (Bastard, Sweden).

A twelve-year relationship with the Tornado Class had also seen John give back an enormous amount of personal time and effort to both the Australian International Tornado Association (AITA) and the International Tornado Association (ITA). He was elected President of the AITA in 1994 taking over the reins from Dr Peter Blaxland who had been President for the past 20 years. John's significant contributions to the class both nationally and internationally led him to be re-elected again in 1996. At the ITA AGM in Canada in August 1995, John was also elected as President of the ITA in charge of International and Olympic affairs and was also responsible for the election of the new younger and proactive Technical Committee of the ITA.

January 1995 saw a major change to John's Olympic Tornado Campaign with the much publicized break-up with his partner Mitch Booth.

John teamed up with his main competitor and longtime catamaran sailor Darren Bundock who had impressed Forbes during his 1992 Olympic Games Campaign. Together they established a successful two-boat training campaign as part of their lead-up to the 1996 Selection Regattas.

Their successes stream-rolled by winning both the 'Sail Sydney Regatta' and the 'NSW' state titles. An outstanding result at the Pre-Olympic Regatta in Atlanta saw the pair place 4th. One week later, they followed up at the Worlds in Kingston in 1995, Canada with a final placing of 14th (8th Nation) which is not bad considering they were cut in half by an Austrian Team on the second day of racing and were forced to miss both 2nd & 3rd heats  of the series as their hull was beyond repair.

January 1996 saw Forbes and Bundock win the Australian Championship by a clear 10 points from a star-studded International fleet in preparation for the 1996 World Championships.  At the 1996 World Championship (Mooloolaba, Australia), Forbes and Bundock finished third overall.

With the Olympic Selections up for grabs these two sailors believed they had proven beyond doubt that they were at the elite level required to bring home a Gold Medal from Atlanta. However, as a result of the Australian Yachting Federation changing the AOC endorsed Olympic Selection Criteria after the first of the two Olympic Selection Regattas had been completed, John and Darren were denied from selection to the Australian Olympic Team and forced to set their sights on Sydney 2000. Determined by the disappointment of denial for Olympic Selection, John and Darren kept the momentum of their Olympic campaign with training partner Andrew Macpherson. John and Darren dominated the Australian Tornado Regatta circuit and won the 1996 NSW and QLD State Championships.

1997 saw John and Darren top the Australian Yachting circuit by defending their National title crown in Perth, winning the International 'Sail Melbourne, Go for Gold' regatta and placing second in the 'Sail Sydney' regatta. John and Darren placed best Australian in both the 1997 NSW State Titles (3rd overall) and the Australian International Regatta, Sydney (2nd overall), a 5th place (3rd Nation) at the 1997 World Championship in Bermuda and then topped off the year by winning the 1997 Sydney International Regatta.

1998 started off with John and Darren winning their third Australian Championship in a row. In May and June they went off to Europe to place third at both the European Championships in Greece and the Kiel Week event in Germany as well as winning the Danish Spring Cup and placing the best Australian in the Dutch Spa Regatta.

In September, John and Darren won GOLD at the Sydney Harbour Regatta, organized by SOCOG as the first ever Sydney 2000 Olympic Test event.

In November the same year, John and Darren achieved their greatest success to date by winning both the South American Championship and the 1998 World Championship (Buzios, Brazil). They then went on to win the World Championship by 18 points from longtime training partners Roland Gaebler and Rene Schwall (Germany). This win made John the first ever Tornado sailor to win three world championships. Since 1967, there were eight sailors who had previously won two world championships. 31 years after the inaugural event, Forbes became the first person to win three times.

John and Darren started off the year 1999 the way they left 1998 by winning Sail Melbourne which was represented by six nations. February saw the pair cross the Tasman to dominate the 'Sail Auckland' regatta.

By the end of 1999, they had finished a four-month European campaign and captured the Number 1 spot on the prestigious 'ISAF O’Neill' World Rankings after winning the 'Princess Sofia Trophy' (Spain), the European Championship (Spain), 'Kiel Week' (Germany) and placing 3rd in 'Hyeres' and 4th at the World Championships in Copenhagen, Denmark. By the end of January 2000 they were selected into the Olympic Team to represent Australia in their hometown Sydney where they won the silver medal. The gold medal was won by Roman Hagara and Hans Peter Steinacher from Austria which was Austria's first-ever gold medal at the summer Olympics.

Their achievements after Sydney 2000 continued with Bundock and Forbes clean streaking the Tornado regatta program in 2001 by winning the World Championship in Richards Bay, South Africa in February and their second European Championship in Silvaplana, Switzerland in August. They also won the 2001/02 Australian Championship for the fourth time together (Forbes’ 10th time) and the 2002 NSW State Titles.

Awards and rewards
On 11 December 2001 Darren and John were one of five finalists for the NSW Institute of Sports “Athlete of the Year”. Other finalists included (first ever female) World Rowing Champions Vicky Roberts and Julia Wilson, Triathlete Peter Robertson, Louise Savage from wheelchair track and road and swimmer (and winner) Ian Thorpe.
On 17 December 2001 John was inducted into the Sydney Northern Beaches Hall of Fame alongside other famous sporting personalities including surfing’s Tom Carrol, Netball’s Anne Sargeant and Swimming’s John Devitt.
On 27 February 2002 Darren and John were awarded the Australian Institute of Sport top “Athlete/Team of the Year”.
This was then followed by Darren and John being awarded the “2001/02 BEA Australian Sailor of the Year” award at Darling Harbour on 8 June 2002. Darren & John were ecstatic with this announcement having previously been finalist in 1999 and 2000 and it being ten years since John previously won the award after his 1992 World Championship and 1992 Barcelona Bronze Medal haul.

Darren and John continued their success in 2003 winning the three biggest and most important Tornado Regattas of the year being the 2003 European Championship (Gran Canaries), the 2003 Athens Test Event (Pre-Olympics) and the 2003 World Championship (Cadiz, Spain - 72 boats from 26 nations). The win for Darren and John put them again in the record books as it was John’s sixth Tornado World Championship Title (1989,92,98,01,02,03) and Darren’s fourth (98,01,02,03). Forbes equalled that of Brazilian sailor Robert Schiedt who had recently won six Laser dinghy class World Titles. Because of that and them winning the 2003 Sail Melbourne regatta in January the pair were selected to represent Australia at the Athens 2004 Olympic Games and were earmarked by many as being the Gold medal favourites.

As a result of the successes both in 2002 and 2003 Darren and John also received the following accolades:
Australian Institute of Sport – Team of the Year.
Australian Yachting Federation – Male Sailors of the Year.
NSW Yachting Association – Male Sailors of the Year.
NSW Institute of Sport – Team Athletes of the Year.
International Sailing Federation – Rolex World Sailor of the Year - finalist.

Whilst the Greek wind Gods didn't show up on time for the Tornado event in Athens, John and Darren still finished 6th place overall and, after three Olympic Games and 18 years at World and Olympic level sailing, Forbes announced his retirement from the sport due to family commitments with his wife Caroline and two daughters Teigan and Bronte. Darren Bundock continued sailing Tornado catamarans and, with Glenn Ashby as Forbes' replacement, they went on to win a further world championship and the silver medal at the Beijing 2008 Olympic Games. Both Darren and Glenn then joined the highly successful 2013 America's Cup teams.

References 

 

1970 births
Sportsmen from New South Wales
Sailors from Sydney
Australian male sailors (sport)
Olympic silver medalists for Australia
Olympic bronze medalists for Australia
Sailors at the 1992 Summer Olympics – Tornado
Sailors at the 2000 Summer Olympics – Tornado
Sailors at the 2004 Summer Olympics – Tornado
Olympic sailors of Australia
Olympic medalists in sailing
Australian Institute of Sport sailors
Living people
Medalists at the 2000 Summer Olympics
Medalists at the 1992 Summer Olympics
Tornado class world champions
World champions in sailing for Australia